Chapin's apalis (Apalis chapini) is a species of bird in the family Cisticolidae. It is found in Malawi, Tanzania, and Zambia. Its natural habitat is subtropical or tropical moist montane forest.

The common name and the Latin binomial commemorate the American ornithologist James Chapin.

References

Chapin's apalis
Birds of East Africa
Vertebrates of Malawi
Fauna of Tanzania
Chapin's apalis
Chapin's apalis
Taxonomy articles created by Polbot
Southern Rift montane forest–grassland mosaic